Junčje is a small settlement north of the village of Sveti Gregor in the Municipality of Ribnica in southern Slovenia. The area is part of the traditional region of Lower Carniola and is now included in the Southeast Slovenia Statistical Region.

References

External links

Junčje on Geopedia

Populated places in the Municipality of Ribnica